The Honda RCV1000R was a road racing motorcycle developed to race in the Open class of the MotoGP world championship for the  season.
It was basically a simplified "production racer" version of the RC213V that non-Motorcycle Sport Manufacturers Association (MSMA) teams could enter in the Open class.

Features
The RCV1000R lacks the seamless shift gearbox and the pneumatic operated valves of the RC213V.  It is less fuel-efficient, and will have a 23-litre fuel tank, less than the 24 litre maximum for the 2014 Open class but still significantly more than the 20 litre limit for the RC213V and the other 2014 bikes with “Factory” status.

Although the machine's geometry is nearly identical to that of the factory RC213V, its ECU uses the official DORNA-issued ECU software, as opposed to the RC213V's HRC-developed custom software. The RCV1000R's 90-degree V4 valve-spring engine produces more than 175 kW at 16000 rpm, with torque of 110 N· m, and is equipped with a conventional transmission. The package supplied to each rider includes 2 machines and 2 spare engines. Teams can conform to the Open class 12-engine regulation by maintaining the supplied engines through 12 cycles.

Reviews
Following his first test of the 2014-spec RC213V and the RCV1000R, Casey Stoner described the latter as having "a similar feeling to the RCV but with a little less power and a different feeling in engine braking."

Complete MotoGP results
(key) (results in bold indicate pole position; results in italics indicate fastest lap)

Note: Hiroshi Aoyama will debut the new Honda RC213V-RS Open class bike at 2014 Valencian Grand Prix, then become an official HRC test rider in 2015.

References

RCV1000R
Grand Prix motorcycles